Denise Campbell (born 15 October 1979) is an English footballer. A tough-tackling midfielder, she played in the FA Women's Premier League National Division for Tranmere Rovers Ladies and Blackburn Rovers Ladies. She was born in Liverpool.

Club career
Campbell captained Tranmere Rovers Ladies before leaving to join Blackburn in the 2006 close season. She scored on her home debut with a free-kick from 35 yards out as Rovers drew 1–1 at home to Leeds United Ladies. In August 2015 Campbell agreed to rejoin Tranmere Rovers.

Blackburn statistics
To 28 October 2009

References

1979 births
Living people
Footballers from Liverpool
English women's footballers
Tranmere Rovers L.F.C. players
Blackburn Rovers L.F.C. players
FA Women's National League players
Women's association football midfielders